Diraz,(also spelled Duraz) is the biggest and most populated village on the northwest coast of Bahrain. It lies to the east of Budaiya, west of Barbar and north of Bani Jamra. Two Dilmun era archaeological sites, namely Diraz Temple and Ain Umm Sujoor, and Ain umm aldjaj are located in this village. Duraz is also known for its people's unique Bahraini dialect which can be easily recognized as it is quite different from its neighbouring villages.

It is a suburb inhabited by Bahraini Shiites with a minority of Asian immigrants

See also
 List of cities in Bahrain
Diraz Temple

References
 Faroughy, Abbas. The Bahrein Islands (750 - 1951) A Contribution To The Study of Power Politics in the Persian Gulf page 11. Verry, Fisher & Co. (New York) 1951

Specific

External links
 Diraz website

Populated places in the Northern Governorate, Bahrain
Populated coastal places in Bahrain